Microlenecamptus albonotatus is a species of beetle in the family Cerambycidae. It was described by Pic in 1925. It is known from Vietnam.

References

Dorcaschematini
Beetles described in 1925